The 7th Edward Jancarz Memorial was the 1999 version of the Edward Jancarz Memorial, an annual motorcycle speedway event. The event took place on 19 June in the Stal Gorzów Stadium in Gorzów Wielkopolski, Poland. The Memorial was won by Tomasz Gollob who beat Robert Sawina, Hans Nielsen and Sławomir Drabik in the final.

Heat details 
 19 June 1999 (Saturday)
 Best Time: 64.92 - Tomasz Gollob in Heat 9
 Attendance: ?
 Referee: Stanisław Pieńkowski

Heat after heat 
 (65,41) Gollob, Adorjan, Paluch, Kwiatkowski (R)
 (66,21) Drabik, Ermolenko, Sawina, Bajerski
 (66,06) Okoniewski, Ułamek, Dados, Skórnicki (F)
 (66,29) Nielsen, Cieślewicz, Kasper, Jąder (F), Rickardsson (T/-)
 (65,03) Gollob, Rickardsson, Skórnicki, Bajerski
 (66,94) Nielsen, Adorjan, Okoniewski, Drabik
 (67,12) Sawina, Ułamek, Cieślewicz, Kwiatkowski
 (68,17) Dados, Paluch, Ermolenko, Kasper (R)
 (64,92) Gollob, Drabik, Ułamek, Kasper
 (67,16) Dados, Cieślewicz, Bajerski, Adorjan
 (66,47) Ermolenko, Nielsen, Skórnicki, Kwiatkowski
 (66,19) Sawina, Okoniewski, Paluch, Rickardsson
 (67,57) Gollob, Nielsen, Sawina, Dados
 (66,37) Rickardsson, Ułamek, Ermolenko, Adorjan
 (67,12) Bajerski, Okoniewski, Kasper, Kwiatkowski
 (67,65) Drabik, Cieślewicz, Paluch, Skórnicki
 (68,64) Ermolenko, Okoniewski, Gollob, Cieślewicz
 (68,25) Sawina, Adorjan, Skórnicki, Kasper
 (66,75) Rickardsson, Drabik, Dados, Kwiatkowski
 (67,46) Nielsen, Ułamek, Paluch, Bajerski
 The Final (top four riders)
 (67,76) Gollob, Sawina, Nielsen, Drabik (T)

See also 
 motorcycle speedway
 1999 in sports

References

External links 
 (Polish) Stal Gorzów Wlkp. official webside

Memorial
1999
Edward J